Ortún Velázquez de Velasco (Cuéllar, Castile – 4November 1584, Pamplona, New Kingdom of Granada) was a Spanish conquistador. He is known as the co-founder and first governor of Pamplona in the Norte de Santander department of Colombia, which borders Venezuela.

American expeditions

Velázquez de Velasco took part in the expedition of the Spanish conquest of the Muisca people led by Gonzalo Jiménez de Quesada from 1536 to 1539. He then settled in Tunja under Gonzalo Suárez Rendón. He married there, was mayor of the city in 1544, and left in 1548. From 1549 he participated in the conquest of the Chitarero people and the foundation of Pamplona under Pedro de Ursúa.

Personal life
Ortún Velázquez de Velasco was born around 1500 in the town of Cuéllar, Segovia Province, Castile and León; the only son of Gutierre Velázquez de Cuéllar, lord of Villavaquerín, and María Enríquez de Acuña. He had one sister, Ana Velázquez. Velázquez de Velasco married Luisa Montalvo de Lugo in Tunja in 1545 and the couple had three children: one son and two daughters. María Velázquez de Velasco y Montalvo married conquistador Juan Maldonado Ordóñez.

See also 

 List of conquistadors in Colombia
 Spanish conquest of the Muisca
 El Dorado
 Spanish conquest of the Chitarero
 Gonzalo Jiménez de Quesada, Gonzalo Suárez Rendón, Pamplona, Norte de Santander

References

Bibliography

Further reading 
 
 
 
 
 
 
 
 

Year of birth unknown
1584 deaths
16th-century Spanish people
16th-century explorers
People from Segovia
Spanish conquistadors
Castilian-Leonese conquistadors
Spanish city founders
History of the Muisca
History of Colombia
Norte de Santander Department
People from Pamplona, Norte de Santander
Tunja